Negulești may refer to several villages in Romania:

 Negulești, a village in Dealu Morii Commune, Bacău County
 Negulești, a village in Piatra Șoimului Commune, Neamț County